This is a list of elections in Canada scheduled to be held in 2019. Included are municipal, provincial and federal elections, by-elections on any level, referendums and party leadership races at any level. In bold are provincewide or federal elections (including provincewide municipal elections) and party leadership races.

January through April
January 10: Blueberry River First Nation family councillor by-election
January 24: Topsail-Paradise, Newfoundland and Labrador provincial by-election
January 30: Nanaimo, British Columbia provincial by-election
February 5: New-Wes-Valley, Newfoundland and Labrador municipal by-election
February 13: St-Pierre-Jolys, Manitoba municipal by-election
February 25: Federal by-elections in Burnaby South, York—Simcoe and Outremont
March 2: 
Hornby Island Local Trust Area by-election
Lytton, British Columbia municipal by-election
March 11: Thompson, Manitoba municipal by-election
March 14: Selkirk First Nation council by-election (cancelled due to acclaimation)
March 30: Cariboo Regional District Area F Director by-election
April 3: Municipal by-election in Nipawin, Saskatchewan
April 6: 
Alberni-Clayoquot Regional District Areas B and F by-elections
North Saanich municipal by-election
Powell River municipal by-election
Tsawwassen First Nation legislative election
April 8: Municipal by-elections in Turner Valley, Alberta (mayoral race was acclaimed)
April 10: Mayerthorpe, Alberta municipal by-election
April 15: Municipal by-election in Rideau-Rockcliffe Ward in Ottawa
April 16: 2019 Alberta general election
April 17: Municipal by-election in Muenster, Saskatchewan
April 23: 2019 Prince Edward Island general election
April 25: York Region District School Board by-election for Vaughan wards 1 & 2

May through June
May 3: Municipal by-election in Rocky Mountain House, Alberta
May 5: 
Municipal by-election in District 2, Saint-Colomban, Quebec
Mayoral by-election in Trois-Rivières, Quebec
May 6: 
Federal by-election in Nanaimo—Ladysmith
Municipal by-elections in New Brunswick: Saint John (Ward 3), Beaubassin East (Ward 4), Bertrand, Blacks Harbour, Campobello (mayor), Florenceville-Bristol (Ward 2), Hanwell, Le Goulet, Paquetville, Rivière-Verte,  and Sainte-Marie-Saint-Raphaël (mayor and council) and plebiscite in Rogersville
May 9: Municipal by-election in Paradise, Newfoundland and Labrador
May 11: 
Municipal by-election in Cranbrook, British Columbia
Haida Gwaii School District by-election
May 16: 2019 Newfoundland and Labrador general election
May 18: Municipal by-election in Yarmouth, Nova Scotia
June 2:
Municipal by-election in District 4, Baie-d'Urfé, Quebec
Municipal by-election in District 4, Saint-Bruno-de-Montarville, Quebec
June 3: Haisla Nation election
June 9: 
Municipal by-election in District 1, Brownsburg-Chatham, Quebec
Municipal by-elections in Saint-Lazare, Quebec
June 12: Municipal by-election in Valleyview, Alberta
June 15: By-election for Director of Electoral Area A (Metro Vancouver, British Columbia)
June 16: 
Municipal by-election in District 4, Drummondville, Quebec
Municipal by-election in District 3, La Malbaie, Quebec
June 18: Provincial by-election in Sackville-Cobequid, Nova Scotia
June 20: Municipal by-elections in Wards 2 and 3 in the Municipality of Oakland – Wawanesa, Manitoba
June 23: Municipal by-elections (including mayor) in Chambly, Quebec

July through September
July 7: Municipal by-election in Moisie-Les Plages District, Sept-Îles, Quebec
July 10: Municipal by-election in Spruce Grove, Alberta
July 13: 
Municipal by-election for councillor in Nakusp, British Columbia
School District 87 Stikine, British Columbia Trustee by-election
July 15: 
Deferred election in Charlottetown-Hillsborough Park, Prince Edward Island
Carcross/Tagish First Nation by-election
July 17: Municipal by-election in Maple Creek, Saskatchewan
July 27:
Haida Nation council by-election for Skidegate
School District 78 Fraser-Cascade, British Columbia trustee by-election
August 1: Tsawwassen First Nation legislative by-elections
September 3: Provincial by-elections in Argyle-Barrington, Northside-Westmount and Sydney River-Mira-Louisbourg, Nova Scotia
September 4: 
Municipal by-elections in the Municipality of Norfolk Treherne, Manitoba
Haisla Nation by-election.
September 7: Municipal by-election in Stewart, British Columbia
September 10: 2019 Manitoba general election
September 11: Municipal by-election in Wetaskiwin, Alberta
September 14: 
Municipal by-election in Port Alice, British Columbia
Municipal by-election in Annapolis Royal, Nova Scotia
September 16: Territorial by-election in Tununiq, Nunavut
September 17: 
Municipal by-election in Grand Falls-Windsor, Newfoundland and Labrador
Municipal by-election in Electoral Division 5, Westlock County and Division 2, Sturgeon County, Alberta
September 24: Municipal by-election in Bishop's Falls, Newfoundland and Labrador
September 28: Municipal by-election in Sooke, British Columbia
September 29: Municipal by-election in District 4, Oka, Quebec

October through December
October 1: 2019 Northwest Territories general election
October 5: 
Municipal by-election in the Regional District of Nanaimo (Nanaimo G).
Municipal special election in District 15 Lower Sackville, Halifax, Nova Scotia.
October 6: Municipal by-elections in District 2, La Tuque; District 5 (Vieux-Nord), Lac-Mégantic; and Le Plateau-Mont-Royal Borough Mayor, Montreal, Quebec.
October 21: 
2019 Canadian federal election
Municipal by-election in Foam Lake, Saskatchewan
October 23: Municipal by-elections in Wolseley and Naicam, Saskatchewan.
October 24: Elk Island Catholic Schools trustee by-election, Fort Saskatchewan, Alberta Ward 2.
October 27: Municipal by-election in District 3, Verchères, Quebec
October 28: 
Nunavut municipal elections
Champagne and Aishihik First Nations council by-election
November 2: Municipal by-elections in Tofino and Osoyoos, British Columbia.
November 10: Municipal by-election District 5 (du Berceau) in Saint-Joseph-du-Lac, Quebec
November 24: 
Municipal by-election in District 19 (Marc-Aurèle-Fortin), Laval, Quebec
Hampstead, Quebec development project referendum.
November 25: First Nation of Na-Cho Nyak Dun by-election (youth councillor).
November 30: Municipal by-election in Telkwa, British Columbia
December 1: Municipal by-election in District 5 Richelieu, Quebec
December 2: Provincial by-election in Jean-Talon, Quebec
December 9: 
Northwest Territories municipal elections, 2019 (hamlets)
Nunavut District Education Authority by-elections in Qikiqtarjuaq, Arctic Bay and Clyde River, Nunavut
December 15: Municipal by-election in District 6, Chelsea; and District 1, Saguenay, Quebec
December 16: Mayoral by-election in Cape Dorset, Nunavut.

References

 
Political timelines of the 2010s by year